Chetostoma is a genus of flies in the family Tephritidae, containing the following species:

Chetostoma admirandum
Chetostoma californicum
Chetostoma completum
Chetostoma continuans
Chetostoma curvinerve
Chetostoma dilutum
Chetostoma ermolenkoi
Chetostoma interruptum
Chetostoma japonicum
Chetostoma melliculum
Chetostoma mirabile
Chetostoma miraculosum
Chetostoma mundum
Chetostoma rubidum
Chetostoma stackelbergi

References

 
Tephritidae genera
Taxa named by Camillo Rondani